Musoduro is a 1953 French-Italian drama film directed by Giuseppe Bennati and starring Fausto Tozzi, Marina Vlady and Cosetta Greco.

Cast
 Fausto Tozzi as Marco / Musoduro  
 Marina Vlady as Lucia Giardano  
 Cosetta Greco as Anita  
 Gérard Landry as Romolo  
 Odoardo Spadaro as Pinzi, venditore ambulante  
 Giulio Calì as Rospo  
 José Jaspe as Carabinieri  
 Alessandro Fersen as Dott. Biondi  
 Gianni Cavalieri as Il sacerdote  
 Dante Nello Carapelli as Giordono

References

Bibliography 
 Goble, Alan. The Complete Index to Literary Sources in Film. Walter de Gruyter, 1999.

External links 
 

1953 drama films
French drama films
Italian drama films
1953 films
1950s Italian-language films
Films directed by Giuseppe Bennati
Films scored by Nino Rota
1950s Italian films
1950s French films